The Republic of China (Taiwan) competed at the 1976 Winter Olympics in Innsbruck, Austria.  The ROC would not return to the Olympics until 1984 and under the name "Chinese Taipei" due to objections by the People's Republic of China over the political status of Taiwan. The PRC boycotted the Olympics due to the Taiwanese participation under the name "Republic of China".

Alpine skiing

Men

Biathlon

Men

 1 One minute added per close miss (a hit in the outer ring), two minutes added per complete miss.

Cross-country skiing

Men

Luge

Men

(Men's) Doubles

Notes

References
 Official Olympic Reports
 Olympic Winter Games 1976, full results by sports-reference.com

Nations at the 1976 Winter Olympics
1976
1976 in Taiwanese sport